Rudolf Geschwind (born 29 August 1829 in Hředle, Bohemia, Austro-Hungary - today Czech Republic  died 30 August 1910 in Karpfen, Austro-Hungary, Krupina, today Slovakia was a German Austrian rosarian known for his breeding of rose cultivars.

Studies and professional activities

Interested in growing plants even in his childhood, Rudolf Geschwind pursued his studies for two years at the Technical University in Prague. He then continued his studies at the Academy for Forestry in Schemnitz today Banska Stiavnica în Slovakia, graduating in 1852. He then started working for the Austro-Hungarian Department of Forestry. His work was carried out in various parts of the Austro-Hungarian empire, on the territory of today's Italy, Ukraine, Poland, Czech Republic, Slovakia and Hungary

However, his hobby was the breeding of roses. From 1860 to 1910 he created around 140 rose cultivars, most of them resistant to frost. He acquired international fame during the Exposition Universelle (1889) in Paris, where he presented his collection of climbing roses.

After his death, in 1910, his entire collection of cultivars was purchased by countess Marie Henrieta Chotek for her rosarium in Dolná Krupá.

Rose cultivars created by Rudolf Geschwind

References

Notes

Bibliography about the Geschwind

Rudolf Geschwind 1829 - 2009 (1910 - 2010). Sammelband des Internationalen Symposiums Rudolf Geschwind 1829 - 2009 gewidmet dem 180. Jahrestag der Geburt von Rudolf Geschwind abgehalten in Krupina und Zvolen am 11. un 12. Juni 2009. Ed.: Miroslav Lukáč. Korrigierte slowakisch-deutsche Ausgabe. Krupina : Die Stadt Krupina in Zasammenarbeit mit Kulturzentrum und Andrej Sládkovič-Museum in Krupina, 2011. 184 Seiten. 

19th-century Austrian people
Austro-Hungarian people
Rose breeders
German Bohemian people
Austrian people of German Bohemian descent
Czech expatriates in Hungary
Austrian expatriates in Hungary
1829 births
1910 deaths